It's-It Ice Cream is an ice cream manufacturer and distributor since 1928, based in Burlingame, California. The company has four products with their most popular being the It's-It ice cream sandwich, which is a scoop of ice cream sandwiched between two oatmeal cookies and dipped in dark chocolate. The original vanilla It's-It has been available in additional flavors since the 1980s.

History 

The It's-It was invented in 1928 by George Whitney, one of the original business owners when San Francisco's Playland at the Beach opened across the Great Highway from Ocean Beach. One version of the name's origins is that Whitney was experimenting and cried out "It's-It!" when he hit on the combination of a sandwich of vanilla ice cream inside two oatmeal cookies, covered in chocolate. Another version is that he heard someone answer the question which cow had won a cow race that day (a tradition at Playland); the cow's name was It.

For nearly forty-five years, until Playland was demolished in 1972, the It's-It was available only at Whitney's shop.  After Playland closed, the It's-It name was passed to George Mavros, who sold the ice cream sandwiches at another location near Ocean Beach.

In 1974, the Shamieh brothers; and their brother-in laws, A.L. McDow and Isa Zaru, bought the It's-It business. They mechanized production, first at a facility on 11th Street in downtown San Francisco, moving to the current factory in Burlingame in 1976. The company's products are now sold in supermarkets and convenience stores. Chocolate, strawberry, mint and cappuccino flavors were added in the 1980s and green tea in 2016; pumpkin is also available. The company has also added other ice cream products, including the "Super Sundae", the "Big Daddy", the "Super Cone", and the "Chips It".

References

External links

 It's-It Ice Cream Company Official Website
 About It's-It and Playland at the Beach

Ice cream brands
Companies based in Burlingame, California
California culture
Cuisine of the Western United States
Food and drink in the San Francisco Bay Area
Cookie sandwiches
Dairy products companies in California